Nebria asturiensis is a species of ground beetle from Nebriinae subfamily that is endemic to Spain.

References

asturiensis
Beetles described in 1964
Beetles of Europe
Endemic fauna of Spain